Leetown may refer to:

United States
 Leetown, Arkansas, a village
 Leetown, Kentucky, an unincorporated community
 Leetown, Mississippi, an unincorporated community
 Leetown, Virginia, an unincorporated community
 Leetown, West Virginia, an unincorporated community

Scotland
Leetown, Perth and Kinross, a community